Sylvia Gomez is a Puerto Rican television journalist and show host. For 50 years, Gomez has been active on Puerto Rican television. She is best known as an anchorwoman for canal 2's television news show, "Telenoticias en Accion".

Career
Gomez earned her bachelor's degree in Drama and English Literature from the University of Puerto Rico and a master's degree in English Literature from the University of Michigan in Ann Arbor.

Gomez began her career in 1972, as a young show host and producer at Puerto Rico's government channel, Canal 6.
In 1975, Gomez became a newscaster at canal 11, which, at the time, was a major television channel in the country.

During 1979, Gomez moved to canal 4, where she joined the cast of that station's news show, "Noticentro 4". One year later, in 1980, Gomez moved to canal 4's main rival on Puerto Rican television, canal 2, also known as Telemundo

She has worked at Telemundo since, and, as of 2022, she had been employed by that network as an anchorwoman and television reporter for 42 years.

Also during 2022, Gomez sued Telemundo for alleged discrepancies in the salaries earned by women there and those earned by men. The journalist and the station reached an agreement early that year.

Awards
During 2016, Gomez was awarded a scholarship for investigative ecological reporting by the University of Puerto Rico.

On June 12, 2022, Gomez, along with Cyd Marie Fleming, Luz Nereida Vélez and Eddie Miro (who received a gold circle Emmy for his more than 50 years in Puerto Rican television), was awarded a silver circle Emmy for her by then 50 years trajectory on Puerto Rican television.

Personal
She is married to a man named Roberto.

Gomez is a firm believer of the existence of God.

Gomez has faced back problems, having had back surgery during 2019, and requires visiting a doctor for those. After one such visit, in 2020, she fell while walking down a set of stairs at a hospital and suffered various injuries to her right ankle and her head. Gomez was hospitalized at the same hospital she was visiting, remaining there for five days. Her foot and ankle required a surgery and her head injury required stitches. She was then ordered to rest at home for about three months.

See also
List of Puerto Ricans
Anibal Gonzalez Irizarry
Pedro Rosa Nales
Keylla Hernandez
Luis Francisco Ojeda
Rafael Bracero
Junior Abrams
Luis Antonio Cosme
Jennifer Wolff
Guillermo Jose Torres

References 

Year of birth missing (living people)
Puerto Rican television journalists
University of Michigan College of Literature, Science, and the Arts alumni
University of Puerto Rico alumni
Place of birth missing (living people)